Ramtek Dam, is an earthfill dam on Sur River near Ramtek, Nagpur district in the state of Maharashtra in India.

Specifications

Purpose
 Irrigation

See also
 Dams in Maharashtra
 List of reservoirs and dams in India

References

Dams in Nagpur district
Dams completed in 1913
1913 establishments in India